Jesko or Jesco is a male given name, which is used among Slavs and in Germany. It is a short form of Jaromir or Jaroslaw and may mean "the peaceful one", "the brave one", "the proud one" or "the soldierly one".

There may be a link with the name of Polish ruler Mieszko I of Poland.

Like many traditional names ending with -ko such as Aiko, the name Jesko is somewhat associated with the gentry in Germany, but also used by other families. It is popular in the "von Puttkammer" family. Because it is an old name it is used in the more traditional minded population and is rare among the general population.

Notable people with name include:

 Jesko Friedrich, German comedic television actor and writer
 Jesco von Puttkamer, German-American aerospace engineer and senior NASA manager
 Jesko Albert Eugen von Puttkamer, German colonial military chief
 Jesko Raffin, Swiss motorcycle racer
 Jesco White, Entertainer from Boone County, West Virginia. Subject of the documentary “Dancing Outlaw.”

Other
 Koenigsegg Jesko, a mid-engine sports car produced by Swedish automobile manufacturer Koenigsegg.

Sources 

Given names